Cafection is a coffee brewer equipment manufacturer based in Canada. It is one of the leading North American professional coffee brewing system manufacturers and OEM suppliers, with more than 3.000 clients and 62.500 coffee machines in Canada and United States.
Cafection designs, manufactures and distributes coffee equipment to various industries, including Office Coffee Service, Hospitality, Foodservice and C-Store. The company served over 2 billion cups of coffee in 2012.
The coffee brewers made by Cafection produce only biodegradable by-products.

History
After decades of business in the coffee industry, Mrs. and Mr. Yves Baron started manufacturing their own bean-to-cup coffee brewers in 1996. In 2011, they sold the company to their son Frank Baron.

The enterprise said it was possibly the first in the world to launch Internet connected touchscreen coffeemakers in 2012.
Cafection has partnerships with Apple, Google, Aramark, Facebook, Microsoft and Bill and Melinda Gates' Foundation.

In February 2013, Cafection was named "Business of the Year" at the Fidéides gala, held by the Chamber of Commerce of Quebec City.

References

Manufacturing companies established in 1996
Privately held companies of Canada
Companies based in Quebec
Manufacturing companies of Canada
1996 establishments in Quebec